Patricia "Pat" Dooley (born November 12, 1946) is a member of the House of Representatives in the U.S. state of Georgia. Dooley is a Democrat and has represented District 38, which encompasses parts of Cobb County, since she defeated Thunder Tumlin on November 4, 2008, by a three percentage point margin.

Dooley is a member of three committees: Agriculture and Consumer Affairs, Budget and Fiscal Affairs Oversight, and Industrial Relations.

References
 

Living people
Democratic Party members of the Georgia House of Representatives
Women state legislators in Georgia (U.S. state)
21st-century American politicians
21st-century American women politicians
1946 births